The Tale of One Bad Rat is a 4-issue comic book limited series by Bryan Talbot. It was first published by Dark Horse Comics in 1994 and later brought out in a collected edition.

The story is about a victim of child abuse. It makes heavy reference to the works of Beatrix Potter.

One Bad Rat is the most mainstream of Talbot's works and is drawn in a simple, naturalistic style with painted colours. Unusually for Talbot (and the comics industry in general), all of the characters were drawn from life, and the locations from photographs of real places.

Plot synopsis
Although it was first published in four comic books, The Tale of One Bad Rat is divided into three sections. Its heroine is called Helen Potter; Helen was Beatrix Potter's first name.

In the first chapter, "Town", Helen Potter is a teenage runaway begging on the streets of London with only her pet rat and her Beatrix Potter books for company, and contemplating suicide. In flashback we learn that she has fled her uncaring mother and sexually abusive father. She is also a talented artist. She moves into a squat with some young men who save her from the unwanted attentions of a man (who turns out to be a Conservative MP) by mugging him. When she is later spotted by the MP, she is forced to flee from the police. She returns to the squat to find that her rat has been killed by the squatters' cat, and leaves to hitchhike north.

"Road" sees Helen making her way north towards the Lake District, drawn by its connection with Beatrix Potter, and accompanied by a giant vision of her rat. There are further flashbacks to the crisis that made her flee her family home. Eventually, in deep countryside, a driver makes a pass at her. She fights him off with such ferocity that he crashes the car. Helen flees into the evening, eventually passing out outside a mysterious building.

In "Country" it is revealed that Helen collapsed outside a country pub and has been taken on as a waitress there. Walking in the hills (still with her giant imaginary rat) and reading self-help books helps her to heal her wounds and prepares her to face her parents. She confronts her father and tells her parents she wants to stay in the Lake District. Finally she visits Hill Top, Beatrix Potter's home, and imagines finding a lost Potter book - "The Tale of One Bad Rat" - whose story echoes her own and gives a happy ending. The chapter, and series, ends with Helen sitting sketching a dramatic view over Buttermere and Crummock Water.

Collected editions
The series has been collected into an individual volume:

The Tale of One Bad Rat (136 pages, softcover, Dark Horse, October 1995, Titan Books, January 1996, hardcover, Dark Horse, April 1997, Jonathan Cape, August 2008)

Awards
The Tale of One Bad Rat won the 1995 UK Comic Art Award for Best New Publication and the 1995 Don Thompson Award for Best Limited Series. The collected edition won the Eisner Award for best Graphic Album Reprint in 1996, and received several other awards and nominations, including a nomination for the James Tiptree, Jr. Award in 1997.

References

External links
The Tale of One Bad Rat homepage at Bryan Talbot's official website

Comics by Bryan Talbot
Eisner Award winners